The Thingal patham  is one of the sub-sections of Arul Nool which was the secondary scripture of Ayyavazhi. 
The author of the content is unknown. This contains the events and reason for the Avatar of Vaikundar. It also contains some prophecies.

Ayyavazhi texts